Woodchuck Hill is a mountain in Schoharie County, New York. It is located northwest of South Gilboa. Mine Hill is located south-southeast and Mount Jefferson is located west-southwest of Woodchuck Hill.

References

Mountains of Schoharie County, New York
Mountains of New York (state)